Ophraella notulata is a species of skeletonizing leaf beetle in the family Chrysomelidae. It is found in Central America and North America.

References

External links

 

Galerucinae
Articles created by Qbugbot
Beetles described in 1801
Taxa named by Johan Christian Fabricius